Sadków is a city district of Radom, Poland, located in the east part of the city.

History 
Before the World War II, the current territories of the district were a part of the village of Sadków located outside the borders of Radom. After the war, part of the village of was incorporated into the city forming the district.

Description 
A big part of the district is made by a military base and Radom Airport.

External links 
 Sadków (2) in Geographical Dictionary of the Kingdom of Poland, vol. 10, Rukszenice–Sochaczew. Warsaw, 1889, pag
 Sadków (1) in Geographical Dictionary of the Kingdom of Poland, vol. 10, part 2, Januszpol–Wola Justowska, Warsaw, 1902, p. 569.
Radom